Samuel Eleazer Kronenberg (né Lejzor Hirszowicz Kronenberg; 1773–1826) was a Polish-Jewish banker and industrialist. The son of Hirsz Kronenberg, he was also a brother of Anna Maria Kronenberżanka Breslauerowa (1781-1853).

Originally from Wyszogród, he later moved to Warsaw and founded the S. L. Kronenberg Bank.  He had thirteen children with his wife, Tekla Teresa (née Lewyanka) Kronenberżyna (1775-1848). Eight of their children, including five sons, survived.

Among the surviving sons was Leopold Stanisław Kronenberg (1812-1878), who became a Crypto-Jewish Calvinist in order to maintain economic security. Leopold and at least two of the other sons became bankers and important figures in Polish politics, and several of his children married into other aristocratic families.

Another of Samuel's sons was Henryk Andrzej Kronenberg, who became a medical doctor, and who converted to Roman Catholicism.

Only Samuel's eldest son, Ludwik Kronenberg (né "Lewek" or "Yehuda Arie Leib", 1783–1882), remained Jewish thereafter.

References

1773 births
1826 deaths
People from Płock County
People from Masovian Voivodeship (1526–1795)
18th-century Polish Jews
Polish bankers